The majority of writers on business in China are Chinese authors, writing in Chinese for Chinese audiences. Others include western "old China hands" and journalists.

Chinese authors
Notable Chinese business authors include academics such as Li Yining, Disequilibrium in the Chinese Economy (1990), as well as media pundits such as businessman Ni Runfeng.

Western authors
Since the economic opening of China, several of the first generation of Western businessmen in China have also written accounts of their experiences:
 Tim Clissold Mr. China: A Memoir 2006 2nd.Ed. 2010, on running Jack Perkowski's Asimco.
 Jack Perkowski Managing the Dragon: How I’m Building a Billion Dollar Business in China 2008

Others have been written by journalists:
 Jim Mann Beijing Jeep 1997, former Los Angeles Times Beijing Bureau chief describes the early Beijing Jeep JV.
 James L. McGregor One Billion Customers 2005 by former Wall Street Journal China bureau chief.

Related is the category of business fiction such as the novel of John D. Kuhns China Fortunes: A Tale of Business in the New World 2010

References

China
Writers about China